= RusNet =

IRC network

- Founded: 1997
- Geographic location: Russia
- Website URL: www.rus-net.org
- Primary DNS: irc.rus-net.org
- Average users: 5,000 - 14,000
- Average channels: 7,000 - 10,000
- Average servers: 44
- Content/subject: Public/Unrestricted

RusNet is the largest IRC network in Russia, Ukraine, and most of the ex-USSR, founded in 1997 through merge of the leading local IRC networks SibNet, VolgaNet, OdNet, and LvNet.

In 2008, RusNet became the 10th most popular IRC Network in the world, with 10233 average users (max 16883) and 8141 channels running on 43 servers. Particularly, it owes its popularity to several citywide Russian LANs that provide their users with the free access to RusNet IRC.

All servers connected to RusNet support all main Cyrillic encoding schemes, allowing users with different operating systems to communicate freely. The choice of the character encoding is defined by the TCP port used to connect to the network but may be changed later on-the-fly.

Currently all network servers support SSL connection. There are experimental servers that support UTF-8 encoding.

RusNet provides all modern IRC services, such as channel registration, username registration, etc.

== Founders ==
- Adel Abushaev (rawSocket)
- Alexandr Dubovikov (baron)
- Evgeniy Lineytsev (dARK)
